North Douglas High School is a public high school in Drain, Oregon, United States.

Academics
In 2008, 83% of the school's seniors received their high school diploma. Of 23 students, 19 graduated, two dropped out, one received a modified diploma, and one was still in high school the following year.

Mascot
In compliance with state law, the "Warriors" name will be retained, but the mascot "Willie the Warrior" will be retired at the end of the 2016 school year and other Native American imagery will be removed.

References

High schools in Douglas County, Oregon
Public high schools in Oregon